"Enough Is Enough" is a hard rock song by the Canadian rock band April Wine. It was written by Myles Goodwyn and appeared on the band's tenth studio album, Power Play (1982). The song was the first single released from the album and was a big hit in Canada and the United States.

The song reached No. 12 on the Canadian Top Singles, No. 50 on the Billboard Hot 100 and No. 9 on the Mainstream Rock Tracks, making it their biggest hit on the latter chart. "Enough is Enough" remains a popular classic rock song in North America, while CKKQ-FM "the Q" ranked it as the 146th best Canadian song of all time.

Music video
The music video for the song was directed by Mark Longstreth and shows the members of April Wine inside the cab of a transport truck, while a beautiful woman in a sports car is driving beside them. The video was premiered on MTV in 1982.

Charts

References

1982 songs
April Wine songs